McChrystal is a Scottish surname. Notable people with the surname include:

Herbert J. McChrystal (1924–2013), United States Army general
Mark McChrystal (born 1984), Northern Irish footballer
Stanley A. McChrystal (born 1954), United States Army general

See also
McCrystal

Surnames of Scottish origin